Maraji are the supreme legal authority for Twelver Shia Muslims. The following articles contain lists of Maraji:
 List of current Maraji List of deceased Maraji

See also

Marja'
Ijtihad
Hawza
Risalah (fiqh)
List of Ayatollahs
List of Hujjatul Islams